Caucasian Psychosis is a compilation album of Babyteeth and Pleasure Death by the rock band Therapy?. It was released on 13 April 1992 via Quarterstick Records in North America. Southern Records released the album in Europe. Both mini-albums had been previously released in Europe on Wiiija Records.

The album was released on 12" vinyl, CD, and cassette. The European vinyl came with a poster.

Track listing
All songs written by Therapy?

Personnel
Therapy?
Andy Cairns – vocals, guitar
Fyfe Ewing – vocals, drums
Michael McKeegan – bass
with:
Keith Thompson – saxophone on "Loser Cop"
Technical 
Mudd and Therapy? - producer (tracks 1-7)
Harvey Birrell, John Loder and Therapy? - producer (tracks 8-13)
Lori Barbero – photography
Trish O'Callaghan – cover art

Trivia
 The sample in "Meat Abstract" ("Wake up, time to die") is taken from the 1982 movie Blade Runner and is spoken by actor Brion James.
 The sample in "Loser Cop" ("All we represent to them man, is somebody who needs a haircut") is taken from the 1969 movie Easy Rider and is spoken by actor Dennis Hopper.
 The sample in "Loser Cop" ("You little punk") is taken from the 1989 movie Drugstore Cowboy.
 The sample in "Loser Cop" ("Good morning, you fascists, you pigs, you bigots, you pinkos, you fags, you bastards, fuzz. This indoctrination of vocal harassment was compiled by our own Juvenile Division is preparation for the concert this weekend") is taken from the 1973 movie Electra Glide in Blue and is spoken by actor Joe Samsil.
 The sample in "Innocent X" (at 2:25) is taken from the 1988 movie Dead Ringers and is spoken by actor Jeremy Irons.
 The sample in "Innocent X" ("My voice is nothing, my thoughts are nothing, in many respects I'm like you… nothing") is taken from the 1973 porn movie The Devil in Miss Jones and is spoken by actor John Clemens.
 The sample in "Dancin' With Manson" ("Take a knife on up the hill, lover, and kiss the girl goodbye") is taken from the 1978 movie Magic and is spoken by actor Anthony Hopkins.
 The sample in "Skinning Pit" ("Every once in a while I had to take a beating. Back then, I didn't care. The way I saw it, everyone takes a beating sometimes") is taken from the 1990 movie Goodfellas and is spoken by actor Ray Liotta.
 The sample in "Potato Junkie" ("Don't you ever feel attracted to the girls you photograph…") is taken from the 1981 Ozploitation movie Centrespread.
 "Meat Abstract" is named after a piece of art by British avant-garde artist Helen Chadwick.
 "Innocent X" is named after a painting by Irish painter Francis Bacon.
 Andy Cairns plays piano (un-credited) on "Loser Cop".
 The noise at the beginning of "Meat Abstract" is Fyfe Ewing drinking a can of beer in the vocal booth.
 The breathing at the beginning of "Innocent X" belongs to Michael McKeegan.

References

Therapy? albums
Quarterstick Records albums
1992 compilation albums